Tahtaköprü (literally "Wooden bridge") is a town in İnegöl district of Bursa Province, Turkey. The population of Tahtaköprü was 1497 . as of 2012. The area around Tahta köprü was always inhabited throughout the history. Hittites, Pergamon and the Byzantine Empire were among the states ruled over the area. Tahtaköprü was one of the early acquisitions of the rising Ottoman Empire. In 1886  Tahtaköprü hosted Muslim refugees from  the territory annexed by Russia during Russo-Turkish War (1877-1878) Tahtaköprü was occupied three times by the Greek army; first on 6 January 1921, the second on 23 March 1921 and the third on 10 June 1921. But on 6 September 1922 Tahtaköprü was returned to Turkey. Furniture  industry is one of the main sectors of Tahtaköprü economy. Farming, animal husbandry and forestry are among the other economic activities.

References  

Villages in İnegöl District